Dominion is an American apocalyptic fantasy television series created by Vaun Wilmott. It is loosely based on the 2010 film Legion, written by Peter Schink and Scott Stewart. In December 2013, Syfy ordered a pilot episode and the series premiered on the American cable television network Syfy on June 19, 2014. The show was filmed in Cape Town, South Africa. Stewart served as series executive producer, as well as director of the pilot episode, written by Wilmott. In the series, angels are in combat with mankind, which fights back from a reduced civilization.

It was renewed for a 13-episode second season on September 25, 2014, which premiered on July 9, 2015, and concluded on October 1, 2015. On October 13, 2015, Syfy cancelled Dominion after two seasons.

Synopsis
God vanishes and in his absence the archangel Gabriel and his army of lower angels wage war against mankind, believing them to be the cause of God's absence. Although most higher angels remain neutral, Gabriel has convinced the lower angels, the "dogs of Heaven," called "eight-balls" by humans for their black eyes, to fight alongside him. Twenty-five years later, mankind survives in a few fortified cities. The archangel Michael has chosen to side with humanity against Gabriel, living among humans in the fortified city of Vega (once Las Vegas) until the time a prophesied savior appears to save mankind.

Cast

Main
 Christopher Egan as Sgt. 1st Class Alex Lannon is a young and often rebellious V2 soldier in Vega's Archangel Corps, who discovers he is the unlikely savior of humanity, known as the "Chosen One", and the central figure of Vega's dominant official religion, known as "Saviorism".
 Tom Wisdom as Archangel Michael is a legendary warrior known throughout history as the greatest of the archangels; Michael was the only angel to take humanity's side during the Extermination War, turning against his own kind, and was instrumental in defeating his brother Gabriel and saving what was left of mankind. He is Vega's protector and commander of the Archangel Corps.
 Roxanne McKee as Lady Claire Riesen is a teacher to orphan children and believer in Saviorism, and is Alex's lover. Originally Vega's princess and heir to her father's seat, Claire later ascends as ruler of Vega as Lady of the City.
 Luke Allen-Gale as William Whele is Vega's Principate, the religious leader of the Church of the Savior, the religion that has grown since the Extermination War, all based around the concept of the Chosen One. William is secretly loyal to Gabriel and leader of his Black Acolytes in Vega.
 Shivaani Ghai as Arika/Evelyn is the beautiful and wily Queen of Helena, a distant and mysterious fortified city; Evelyn originally came to Vega as "Arika" – supposedly the consort and wife of Queen Evelyn and a diplomat who is part of a negotiating party. Evelyn's true agendas are deceptive, secretive, and mysterious to the residents of Vega. Evelyn acts to maintain the peace between Vega and Helena, maneuvering throughout Vega's leadership with grace and skill.
 Rosalind Halstead as Senator Becca Thorn (season 1) is one of the Senate's consuls, the head of House Thorn and Riesen's confidant. Becca is one of the most powerful leaders in Vega, overseeing all scientific and medical personnel in the city. 
 Anthony Head as Senator David Whele is Vega's Secretary of Commerce, one of the Senate's consuls, the head of House Whele, and William's father. David is the chief of administrator of Vega and the second-most powerful leader in the city, responsible for keeping every government department running, while the Lord commands the military. A ruthless and cunning political operator, David is an ambitious power broker, and an utterly ruthless and narcissistic politician, who is always on the hunt to keep or grow his power by any means necessary. Before the war, David was a devotedly faithful televangelist, but he lost his faith when the angels descended from Heaven and his family was killed by the Possessed.
 Alan Dale as Gen. Edward Riesen is Vega's Lord of the City, the head of House Riesen, and Claire's father. Riesen is Vega's selfless ruler and military leader, who remains a paragon of strength and duty, despite his failing health. Before the war, Riesen was a civilian accountant who studied military history; during the opening hours of the Extermination War, he took a dead general's uniform and name, later leading humanity to victory.
 Carl Beukes as Archangel Gabriel (recurring season 1; main cast season 2) is an archangel and enemy of mankind, Michael's "twin" (in the hierarchy of angels), and the unstable but masterfully manipulative leader of the angels in the war against humanity. Gabriel is responsible for pushing humanity to the brink of extinction after God's disappearance; his aim is to exterminate mankind, believing this will bring God back.
 Kim Engelbrecht as Sgt. Noma Banks (recurring season 1; main cast season 2) is a sergeant in Vega's Archangel Corps, and Alex's friend and fellow soldier, who maintains a casual sexual relationship with him. Noma is secretly a higher angel loyal to Michael, assigned by him to watch over Alex. She is revealed later in season two to be a follower of Lucifer.

Supporting

Season one
 Langley Kirkwood as Jeep Hanson: Alex's adoptive father and Charlie's husband (from Legion), Jeep was a hero of Vega long presumed dead in the Extermination War, and known publicly as Vega's "prophet" for the Chosen One.
 Jonathan Howard as Sgt. Ethan Mack: A sergeant in Vega's Archangel Corps, he works as a guard for House Whele, and is Noma and Alex's best friend and fellow soldier.
 Betsy Wilke as Bixby: A young V1 orphan, Bixby barely eked out an existence in Vega, but was then granted the protection of House Riesen, and a greatly improved standard of living.
 Anton David Jeftha as Furiad: One of the higher angels who have joined Gabriel in his war against humanity, Furiad is Noma's former lover and leader of Gabriel's High Guards.
 Katrine De Candole as Archangel Uriel: An archangel, Michael and Gabriel's sister and Raphael's "twin" (in the hierarchy of angels), Uriel resurfaces after years under ground, a new player of uncertain intentions and loyalties. Her sly, scheming tendencies make her a bit of a loose cannon, and both of her brothers call her insane.
 Kevin Otto as Louis: A neutral higher angel and a refugee from the Extermination War, Louis was a mild-mannered grocer living and working in Vega as a vendor in the marketplace.
 Amy Bailey as Clementine Riesen: Riesen's wife and Claire's mother, Clementine is now one of the Possessed angels, kept by Riesen living at the abandoned Luxor hotel. She retained enough of her human memories to maintain a clandestine relation with Riesen, although it was entirely forbidden and put her at extreme risk, as she would be condemned by both her own kind and the humans of Vega.
 Tyrone Keogh as Lt. Vinceis a security guard for House Whele.
 Kenneth Fok as Capt. Finch is a captain in Vega's Archangel Corps, and Alex, Noma, and Ethan's firm and unforgiving superior officer.
 Danny Keogh as Senator Thomas Frost: One of Vega's senators, Frost is a leader of Vega and is responsible for the city’s "Agritowers", in which much of the food is grown. One of the city's founding fathers, Frost is a powerful believer in the coming of the Chosen One, and is an honest politician allied with Riesen and Michael against David Whele, valuing the truth above all else.
 Fiona Ramsay as Senator Blanch Romero: One of Vega's senators, Romero is one of the leaders of Vega and is responsible for the vitally important nuclear reactor that powers the city. A shrewd politician, Romero has aligned herself with David Whele and against Riesen (when the political winds dictate it).
 Luam Staples as Roan: Originally appearing as a mysterious child savant, Roan accompanied Arika and her retinue of women from Helena to Vega. Favored by Evelyn, the leader of Helena, the silent boy was suspected to be far more than he seemed. Roan is revealed to be one of the higher angels who have joined Gabriel in his war against humanity.
 Julie Hartley as Felicia Aldreen: Claire's servant at House Riesen, Felicia was originally a neutral higher angel and a refugee from the Extermination War, though she later sided secretly with Gabriel.

Season two
 Nicholas Bishop as Gates Foley: A brilliant but troubled military genius, he helped build Vega into the stronghold it has become. Gates is an engineer and an old friend of Riesen's, harbors romantic desires for Claire, and maintains the systems that power the city. He is an MIT alumnus and a die-hard Boston Red Sox fan, using the 2004 ALCS as encouragement to solve complex problems.
 Simon Merrells as Julian: The cunning and powerful leader of New Delphi, Julian is a cryptic man with motives as questionable as his past, and will go to any lengths to protect his city. Julian is later revealed as a Dyad - a symbiosis between a human and a higher angel, controlled by the spirit of Lyrae, a higher angel killed by Michael centuries ago for horrific atrocities against humans during the siege of Sodom and Gomorrah, and his spirit was banished to become a hybrid.
 Christina Chong as Zoe Holloway: A member of Vega’s Archangel Corps who deserted her position, she is unable to tolerate guarding V6s. Zoe is bold, fierce, and scrappy, and joins the V1 rebel faction to overthrow Claire's government.
 Olivia Mace as Laurel: The steadfast leader of Mallory, Alabama, a small Southern town of survivors who have inexplicably managed to insulate themselves from the fallout of the Extermination War, Laurel is deeply devoted to her religious faith and is unwavering in her resolve. Unknown to her, her town was saved by Lucifer, who is using them to return.
 Luke Tyler as Pete: An energetic, bright, dynamic, and eternally optimistic teenager, he who grew up in Missouri before the apocalypse. Pete was a Possessed angel, until Alex performed an eviction that restored his humanity.  He wakes up on the road in the battle-torn world, with no memories of his possession, but retaining his peaceful past. He is later repossessed by the same lesser angel.
 Diarmaid Murtagh as Wes Fuller: A resident of Mallory, he is loyal to Laurel and distrustful of Michael.
 Hakeem Kae-Kazim as the Prophet: A mysterious figure who appears to Noma in the woods, his image appears in the church at Mallory, and he has the power to set the Possessed on fire with a gesture, consuming them from within. He is later revealed to be working with Lucifer and trying to bring him back to life.
 Reine Swart as Charlie: Alex's mother, killed by Noma, while protecting Alex as a baby.

Episodes

Season 1 (2014)

Season 2 (2015)

Reception
Dominion has been met with mixed reviews. On Metacritic, the first season holds a score of 47 out of 100, based on 13 critics, indicating "mixed or average" reviews. On Rotten Tomatoes, the first season holds a rating of 74%.

See also
 List of films about angels

References

External links
 

Post-apocalyptic television series
2010s American drama television series
2014 American television series debuts
2015 American television series endings
American action television series
Angels in television
Apocalyptic television series
English-language television shows
Syfy original programming
Live action television shows based on films
Television series by Universal Content Productions
Television shows set in the United States
Television series by Sony Pictures Television